The Rylands Papyri are a collection of thousands of papyrus fragments and documents from North Africa and Greece housed at the John Rylands University Library, Manchester, UK. The collection includes the Rylands Library Papyrus P52, also known as the "St John's fragment", a fragment from a papyrus codex, generally accepted as the earliest extant record of a Canonical gospel.

The collection
The Rylands Papyri collection held by the John Rylands University Library, is one of the most extensive and wide-ranging papyrus manuscript collections in the United Kingdom. It includes religious, devotional, literary and administrative texts. The collection includes 7 hieroglyphic and 19 hieratic papyri which are funerary documents dating from the 14th century BCE to the 2nd century CE. It also holds 166 demotic papyri, mostly dating from the Ptolemaic period, including the famous Petition of Petiese (pRylands 9) from the reign of Darius I of Persia.

The collection also houses about 500 Coptic papyri, and around 800 Arabic papyri consisting of private letters, together with tradesmen's and household accounts. Among the roughly 2,000 Greek papyri are the famous fragments of the Gospel of John and Deuteronomy, the earliest surviving fragments of the New Testament and the Septuagint (Papyrus 957, the Rylands Papyrus iii.458) respectively; Papyrus 31, a fragment of a papyrus manuscript of the Epistle to the Romans; and Papyrus 32, a fragment of the Epistle to Titus. Also held in the collection is Papyrus Rylands 463, a copy of the apocryphal Gospel of Mary in Greek, and John Rylands Papyrus 470, a prayer in Koine Greek to the Theotokos, written about 250 CE in brown ink, the earliest known copy of such a prayer. It was acquired by the Library in 1917.

Volumes
 . (P.Ryl.Copt.)
 . (P.Ryl.Dem.)
 Volume I: Atlas of Facsimiles.
 Volume II: Hand-copies of the earlier documents. 
 Volume III: Key-list, Translations, Commentaries and Indices.
 . (P.Ryl. I)
 . (P.Ryl. II)
  (P.Ryl. III)
 . (P.Ryl. IV)

See also
John Rylands Library
 P.Ryl. I 4 (p4 on the list Gregory-Aland) — fragment of the Epistle to the Romans in Greek;
 P. Ryl. I 5 (p5 on the list Gregory-Aland) — fragment of the Epistle to Titus in Greek;
 P.Ryl. III 457 (p52 on the list Gregory-Aland) — fragment of the Gospel of John in Greek; 2nd century;
 P.Ryl. III 458 — fragments of the Book of Deuteronomy in Greek; 2nd century BC;
 P.Ryl. III 463 — Greek manuscript of the apocryphal Gospel of Mary; 3rd century

Notes

External links
The Rylands Papyri on the John Rylands University Library website
An Arabic Papyrus From The John Rylands Library, 65 AH / 684-685 CE
Petition by Pediese, a priest of Amen serving during the reign of Darius I

14th-century BC works
13th-century BC works
12th-century BC works
11th-century BC works
10th-century BC works
9th-century BC works
8th-century BC works
7th-century BC works
6th-century BC works
5th-century BC works
4th-century BC works
3rd-century BC works
2nd-century BC works
1st-century BC works
1st-century works
2nd-century works
3rd-century biblical manuscripts
New Testament papyri
Biblical manuscripts
Egyptian papyri
University of Manchester
Egyptian inscriptions
Arabic inscriptions
Roman-era Greek inscriptions